Hiyas is a Philippine romantic-drama TV series aired by ABS-CBN that premiered on May 28, 2012 replacing Wako Wako on its Kapamilya Gold afternoon block timeslot. The series is based on the Filipino romance pocket book Silang, The Fierce Warrior by Sofia. It is the 16th installment of the Precious Hearts Romances Presents series.

The series was marked for the third anniversary installment of the Precious Hearts Romances television adaptations for giving Three Years of Many Top Rating Serials and is the first adaptation to have a Fantasy Action Adventure for Television under 'Precious Hearts Romances' television distribution.

Synopsis
Silang is, a fierce warrior from the ethnic group Tanah, The begotten son of Lucio and Salve who is prophesied to bring the long-lost mythical precious gem in Tanah which is believed that will bring prosperity and reconciliation  between the two raging clans of Lucio and Biano.

He fell in love and set to marry his childhood sweetheart Giana, daughter of Biano, if and only if Silang brings the precious gem in Tanah. This is the only condition given by Biano for Silang before they get married.

As Silang journeys in the city to unfold the mystery of the missing precious gem, he will meet Sapphire Salvador. She is a very sophisticated but charitable woman and will soon marry an eligible bachelor, Aldrich Zaragosa, who is oddly missing on their wedding day. Sapphire is also the unica hija of the owner of Gemini Industries, Donato Salvador who is associated and lead to the missing precious gem.

Silang and Sapphire will go hand-in-hand in search for the truth about the precious gem. Through Sapphire, Silang's quest for 'hiyas' will fall into his hand as the two went into life-threatening danger. Thus, what they've been through will draw their hearts close to each other.

Cast and characters

Main cast
Zanjoe Marudo as Silang
Megan Young as Sapphire Salvador
Edward Mendez as Aldrich Zaragoza
Mercedes Cabral as Giana
John Arcilla as Donato Salvador
Tetchie Agbayani as Elizabeth Salvador
Jong Cuenco as David Zaragoza
Angel Jacob as Rina Zaragoza
Sharmaine Suarez as Legay
Nonie Buencamino as Biano
Allan Paule as Lucio

Supporting cast
Neri Naig as Laura
Tess Antonio as Isay
Archie Alemania as Karel
Lemuelle Pelayo as Raon
Kristel Moreno as Portia
Dionne Monsanto as Gemma
Cara Eriguel as Lenny
Joe Gruta as Apo Asig
Bjorn Aguilar as Langkawan
Alizon Andres as Nestor
Joross Gamboa as Evan
Johan Santos as Bimbo
RJ Calipus as Alex

Special participation
Maliksi Morales as young Silang
Maurice Mabutas as young Sapphire
Phebe Kay Arbotante as young Giana
Joem Bascon as young Biano
Manuel Chua as young Lucio
Bangs Garcia as Salve
Arnold Reyes
Tanya Gomez

Trivia
The television series was set in production in mid-2010 and was originally supposed to be released in April 2011 for the Kapamilya Gold line up for its 2nd Anniversary offering but due to numerous schedule conflicts and new lineups of soaps such as Reputasyon and Mula Sa Puso it was cancelled. The series was finally decided to be aired on May 28, 2012 after the success of its preceding soap PHR presents: Lumayo Ka Man Sa Akin.
Joem Bascon and Nonie Buencamino who portrayed Biano (as young and old, respectively) played their respective antagonist roles in Walang Hanggan as Tomas and Miguel, respectively.

Production
Hiyas is not available in all ABS-CBN Regional Network Group (now ABS-CBN Regional) channels due to local versions of TV Patrol on the same time slot. Instead a replay of recent broadcasts are shown the next day mostly Tuesdays-Friday and Monday on its morning or afternoon block, depending on the station.

Last July 2016. ABS CBN revived the show by uploading Episode 1-35 on YouTube along with Lumayo Ka Man Sa Akin, Pintada, Nasaan Ka, Elisa?, Paraiso, Angelito: Batang Ama and Maria la del Barrio.

See also
Precious Hearts Romances Presents
List of programs broadcast by ABS-CBN
List of dramas of ABS-CBN

References

External links
 

ABS-CBN drama series
2012 Philippine television series debuts
2012 Philippine television series endings
Philippine romance television series
Television shows based on books
Filipino-language television shows
Television shows set in the Philippines